Futebol Clube da Madalena or simply Madalena is a Portuguese football club based in Madalena. The club was founded in 1974.

Current squad

External links
  Official Facebook page

Football clubs in Portugal